NM-2201 (also known as CBL-2201) is an indole-based synthetic cannabinoid that presumably has similar properties to the closely related 5F-PB-22 and NNE1, which are both full agonists and unselectively bind to CB1 and CB2 receptors with low nanomolar affinity.

Pharmacology
NM-2201 acts as a full agonist with a binding affinity of 0.332 nM at CB1 and 0.732 nM at CB2 cannabinoid receptors. It has been linked to serious adverse events in users.

Legal status
NM-2201 is specifically banned in Sweden,  Germany (Anlage II), and Japan but is also controlled in many other jurisdictions under analogue laws.

On May 30, 2018 the United States Drug Enforcement Administration, Department of Justice published a notice of intent to place NM-2201 and 4 other synthetic cannabinoids in schedule I of the Controlled Substances Act. This notice went into effect on June 29, 2018.

Use 
NM-2201 was linked to an incident in December 2015 where 25-30 people in Ocala, FL were taken to hospitals after experiencing seizures.

See also 
 EAM-2201
 MAM-2201
 THJ-2201
 SDB-005

References 

1-Naphthyl compounds
Organofluorides
Designer drugs
Indoles
Carboxylate esters